Amblyptilia punctidactyla, also known as the Brindled Plume, is a moth of the family Pterophoridae found across the Palearctic (including Japan and Europe). The species was first described by the English entomologist, Adrian Hardy Haworth in 1811.

Description
There are two generations per year in western Europe, with Adults on wing in July, and again from September to early-June, hibernating through the winter. The imago of the brindled plume is similar in appearance to the beautiful plume (Amblyptilia acanthadactyla) but is darker appearing greyish-brown (cf. warm reddish-brown colour of the beautiful plume) and has distinct white speckling. Examination of the genitalia is required for certain identification

The larvae feed on the flowers and unripe seeds of various herbaceous plants, but only on shaded plants. Larval food plants include European columbine (Aquilegia vulgaris), common stork's-bill (Erodium cicutarium), meadow crane's-bill (Geranium pratense), bog-myrtle (Myrica gale), primroses (Primula species) and hedge woundwort (Stachys sylvatica).

References

External links
 Taxonomic And Biological Studies Of Pterophoridae Of Japan (Lepidoptera)

Amblyptilia
Moths described in 1811
Moths of Asia
Moths of Europe
Moths of Japan
Taxa named by Adrian Hardy Haworth